Carolina Morace (born 5 February 1964) is an Italian former footballer who played as a striker and is the current head coach of Lazio Women. She played for the Italian national team and for various clubs in women's Serie A. She was the top scorer in Serie A in the 1984–85 season, and for 11 consecutive years from 1987–88 to 1997–98. She is also a registered lawyer.

After retiring as a player, she began a managing career with Lazio. She then managed the Italian national team from 2000 to 2005, and the Canadian national women's team from 2009 to 2011. In 2014, she was the first woman to be inducted into the Italian Football Hall of Fame.

Playing career

International
Born in Venice, Morace debuted for the Italian women's national team in 1978, against Yugoslavia, at the age of 14. During her career, she made 153 appearances for Italy, scoring 105 goals. While playing in the Italian national women's league, she scored more than 550 goals. She took part in six European Championships as well as the inaugural FIFA Women's World Cup China 1991, where she scored four goals, including recording the first ever hat-trick to be scored at a World Cup in their 5–0 win against Chinese Taipei.

As a curtain-raiser to the 1990 FA Charity Shield, Italy played the England women's national football team at Wembley Stadium. Morace scored all four goals in England's 4–1 defeat and was featured on the front page of the following day's La Gazzetta dello Sport, a record that has never been beaten by a male or female player since.

Coaching career
Morace holds a UEFA PRO License and is probably best known for having been the first woman to coach a professional men's football team, Viterbese of Italian Serie C1, a post she took in June 1999. She eventually resigned from her position after only two matches as the President interfered with management of the technical staff.

For 5 years from 2000 to 2005, she was head coach for Italian women's national team, qualifying twice for the European Championships. In 2008–2009 Morace accepted a role as the head coach of a Men's Parliamentary Team preparing them for competition.

In February 2009 she was announced as the new head coach of the Canadian national women's team. Under her guidance, Canada won the 2010 CONCACAF, 2010 and 2011 Cyprus Cups and 2010 Four Nations Tournament.  At the 2011 FIFA Women's World Cup the team's top goal scorer Christine Sinclair broke her nose in the opening match and subsequently the team did not progress to the next round as expected.  In the first ever FIFA Physical Analysis at a Women's World Cup, Canada excelled in the distances covered at high speed in comparison to other teams reflecting in their quick tempo, short passing and high pressing game.  Unexpectedly, she formally announced her resignation as the coach of the Canadian national women's team on Friday 22 July 2011 due to future budget disputes.  Over her 2.5 years in charge Morace improved Canada's FIFA ranking from 11th to 6th position in the World.

From 2011 Carolina Morace has been leading and conducting FIFA Coaching Courses around the world as a FIFA Ambassador and Instructor.  Her experience as the CEO of Juventus Academy Roma prompted her to begin her own Football Academy, Pro Soccer Coaching.

On 17 September 2015 it was announced that Morace had been appointed technical director of a Men's National Premier League Club Floreat Athena FC in Western Australia.

In December 2016 she was appointed Head Coach of her third National Team Trinidad and Tobago Women's National Team. In 2017 she and her team terminated the contract because of payment issues and later won their case with Court of Arbitration for Sport and FIFA.

In 2018 Morace returned to Italy as she became the first coach of A.C. Milan Women in Serie A finishing third in their inaugural season and the only team to defeat Juventus 3–0.

In February 2021 Morace returned to her former side Lazio. On 9 May 2021, Lazio earned promotion back to Serie A for the 2021–22 season. In October 2021, she was sacked by the club, along with assistant coach Nicola Williams after five consecutive losses.

International goals

Personal life
Morace gained a law degree in 1996 and practises at a legal studio in Rome.

After featuring for 13 years on Italian television, Morace became a celebrity in Italy.  Her role as a football commentator and analyst for the Men's Serie A Professional League saw her work across channels La7, Telemontecarlo, Rai 1 and Rai International and write weekly articles for La Gazzetta Dello Sport.

In 2015 Morace featured in a comic book as a coach for a Professional Primavera football squad called "Elfio e i Satanelli!".

On 11 October 2020, Morace came out as lesbian, recounting her life in her book Fuori dagli schemi. She married the former Australian footballer Nicola Williams, with whom she celebrated the wedding twice—first in Bristol, on the SS Great Britain, and the second in Australia.

See also
 List of association women football players with 100 or more international goals
 List of UEFA Women's Championship goalscorers
 List of UEFA Women's Championship records
 List of LGBT sportspeople

References

External links
Unofficial fans' website 

1964 births
Living people
Italian women's footballers
Italy women's international footballers
Italian football managers
Association football commentators
Footballers from Venice
Expatriate soccer managers in Canada
FIFA Century Club
1991 FIFA Women's World Cup players
Canada women's national soccer team managers
2011 FIFA Women's World Cup managers
Torres Calcio Femminile players
Serie A (women's football) players
S.S. Lazio Women 2015 players
A.C.F. Trani 80 players
Women's association football forwards
Female association football managers
Italy women's national football team managers
A.S.D. Reggiana Calcio Femminile players
Lesbian sportswomen
Italian LGBT sportspeople
Serie A (women's football) managers
21st-century LGBT people
ACF Milan 82 players